The Mecklenburg Class G 3 was an early German steam locomotive operated by the Grand Duchy of Mecklenburg Friedrich-Franz Railway. Formerly the Class IX it was a copy of the Prussian G 3.

Description 
In total, there were eight G 3's in the Mecklenburg fleet, which had been built between 1887 and 1895. Of these two originally came from the Lloyd Railway, Neustrelitz - Warnemünde. The engines had a steam brake and an outside valve gear of the Allan type. Five engines were intended for transfer to the Deutsche Reichsbahn, to be numbered 53 7201 to 53 7205; however they were withdrawn before the renumbering plan was implemented.

The locomotives were given Class 3 T 10.5 tenders.

See also 
Grand Duchy of Mecklenburg Friedrich-Franz Railway
List of Mecklenburg locomotives

Notes

References

Further reading 
 

0-6-0 locomotives
G 3
Railway locomotives introduced in 1887
C n2 locomotives

de:Preußische G 3#G 3 bei der Mecklenburgischen Friedrich-Franz-Eisenbahn
Freight locomotives